Richard Martin Berthold (born 1946) is an American classical historian, an associate professor emeritus at the University of New Mexico.
He is the author of two books on classical history, and is also known for his controversial positions on politics and religion.

Books
Berthold is the author of the book Rhodes in the Hellenistic Age (Cornell University Press, 1984)
and of the self-published Dare to Struggle: The History and Society of Greece (2009).

Education and career
Berthold graduated from Stanford University in 1967.
He did his graduate studies at Cornell University, earning a M.A. in 1969 with the thesis The Battle at Marathon and completing his Ph.D. in 1971 with the dissertation Rhodian Foreign Affairs 205-164 B.C.. After a year as a part-time lecturer at Cornell, he joined the faculty of the University of New Mexico in 1972 as an assistant professor. He retired from the University of New Mexico in 2002, but was recalled to teaching in 2006.

Controversies
On the day of September 11, 2001 terrorist attacks Berthold told two large freshman classes that "Anybody who blows up the Pentagon gets my vote." After a university investigation, Berthold received an official reprimand and was removed from teaching first-year classes. The semester after the official reprimand and teaching sanctions took effect, Berthold took early retirement after being charged with sexual harassment.

In 2005 he was barred from a local religious conference center after presenting archaeological research contradicting the biblical story of the Exodus.
He drew renewed media attention in 2018 for using Nazi insignia to protest the policies of the Republican Party.

References

External links
Berthold's defense of his 2001 statements
qqduckus, Berthold's blog

1946 births
Living people
Stanford University alumni
Cornell University alumni
University of New Mexico faculty
Scholars of ancient Greek history